Johan Lædre Bjørdal (born 5 May 1986) is a former Norwegian footballer who plays as a centre back.

Career
Bjørdal was born in Egersund and began his career with his hometown club, Egersund IK, in 2003, but was signed up by Viking FK. He went on loan to FK Tønsberg in the 2005 season, having played just one game for Viking, and returned with eight games experience. Bjørdal remained at Viking for one more season, but did not play any more games, and was signed by FK Bodø/Glimt for the 2007 season. There, he played 26 games in his first season, scoring one goal. He returned to Viking ahead of the 2011 season.

Bjørdal has played at every level of Norwegian international football from under-16 to under-21 level. He was given his debut for Norway's senior team on 6 September 2013 against Cyprus.

Bjørdal's contract with Viking expired after the 2013 season, and he joined the Danish club AGF in January 2014.

In June 2015 he joined the Norwegian footballclub Rosenborg BK. He won the Norwegian top division three times during his spell in Rosenborg, in 2015, 2016 and 2017, as well as the Norwegian Football Cup in 2015 and 2016.

On 23 January 2018 Bjørdal signed a 2,5-year contract with Belgium side Zulte Waregem.

Career statistics

Club

Honours

Club
 Rosenborg
Norwegian League (3): 2015, 2016, 2017
Norwegian Football Cup (2): 2015, 2016
Mesterfinalen (1): 2017

References

External links

1986 births
Living people
People from Egersund
Norwegian footballers
Norway international footballers
Norway under-21 international footballers
Norway youth international footballers
Association football central defenders
Viking FK players
FK Tønsberg players
FK Bodø/Glimt players
Aarhus Gymnastikforening players
Rosenborg BK players
S.V. Zulte Waregem players
Eliteserien players
Norwegian First Division players
Danish Superliga players
Danish 1st Division players
Belgian Pro League players
Norwegian expatriate footballers
Expatriate men's footballers in Denmark
Expatriate footballers in Belgium
Norwegian expatriate sportspeople in Denmark
Norwegian expatriate sportspeople in Belgium
Association football defenders
Sportspeople from Rogaland